Hsin Ping (30 June 1938 - 7 April 1995) was the fourth and fifth abbot of the Fo Guang Shan monastic order and Buddhist organization. He was the chosen dharma heir to Fo Guang Shan founder Hsing Yun.

Hsin Ping entered the Buddhist sangha in 1963. Hsin Ping went on to receive the precepts under Master Tao Yuan of Hai Hui Temple in Keelung in 1963, and went on to attend Shou Shan Buddhist College and the Chinese Buddhist Research Institute at Fo Guang Shan. For lengths of time during the earliest days of Fo Guang Shan, Hsin Ping was stationed in the construction quarters. In 1973, he became first in line of Fo Guang Shan's order of precedence, and became the next head abbot of Fo Guang Shan Monastery in 1985 after Hsing Yun voluntarily stepped down from the role.

In April 1995, Hsin Ping died suddenly after suffering from illness. A portion of his ashes are interred in the United States at the Buddhist columbarium at Rose Hills in California, the rest are in the Longevity Memorial Park in Fo Guang Shan.

The Venerable Hsin Ting served the rest of Hsin Ping's term until 1997, when he was elected head abbot.

1995 deaths
1938 births
Deaths from kidney cancer
Deaths from cancer in Taiwan
Fo Guang Shan Buddhists
Taiwanese Buddhist monks
People from Keelung
Taiwanese religious leaders
Burials at Rose Hills Memorial Park
20th-century Buddhist monks